The Canadian Journal of Chemistry (fr. Revue canadienne de chimie) is a peer-reviewed scientific journal published by NRC Research Press. It was established in 1951 as the continuation of Canadian Journal of Research, Section B: Chemical Sciences. Papers are loaded to the web in advance of the printed issue and are available in both pdf and HTML formats.

Abstracting and indexing 
The journal is abstracted and indexed by the following services: Chemical Abstracts, ChemInform, Chemistry Citation Index, Compendex, Current Contents, Derwent Biotechnology Abstracts, GeoRef, INIS Atomindex, Methods in Organic Synthesis, Referativny Zhurnal, and the Science Citation Index. According to the Journal Citation Reports, its 2020 impact factor is 1.118.

References

External links 
 

Chemistry journals
Monthly journals
Multilingual journals
English-language journals
French-language journals
Publications established in 1951
Canadian Science Publishing academic journals